The Queensland Under-18 rugby league team, also known as Queensland Under-18s or Queensland U18, represents Queensland in the sport of rugby league at an under-18 age level. Since 2008, the team has played an annual fixture against the New South Wales Under-18 team as a curtain raiser to a State of Origin game. The team features players selected from Queensland's premier under-18 rugby league competition, the Mal Meninga Cup. They are administered by the Queensland Rugby League.

History
Prior to 2008, junior interstate matches were contested at under-17 and under-19 levels. In 2008, with the advent of the National Youth Competition, the age levels switched to an under-16 and under-18 format to keep in line with the NSWRL's existing SG Ball Cup and Harold Matthews Cup competitions and the QRL's Mal Meninga Cup and Cyril Connell Cup competitions, which would begin in 2009.

Queensland suffered defeat in the first four under-18 Origin fixtures, not winning a game until 2012. The 2012 team, which featured future NRL players Anthony Milford, Kodi Nikorima and Lloyd Perrett, held on to defeat New South Wales 24–18 at ANZ Stadium in Sydney. Queensland would suffer two more defeats in 2013 and 2014 before picking up their second win in 2015, defeating New South Wales 22–18 at the Melbourne Cricket Ground. Queensland snapped a three-game losing streak with a victory in 2019.

Players
Players selected for the Queensland under-18 team are usually contracted with a National Rugby League (NRL) side but play in either the Mal Meninga Cup, Hastings Deering Colts, Jersey Flegg Cup or Intrust Super Cup competitions. In 2008, before the Mal Meninga Cup began, players were selected from the under-18 representative carnival in Proserpine. Each pre-season the Queensland Rugby League will select an under-18 squad featuring players in contention for the mid-season fixture. The squad participates in a weekend camp at the Queensland Academy of Sport.

2020 squad
The 34-man training squad selected for the 2020 season:

Notable players
Since 2008, twenty-two former Queensland under-18 players have gone onto represent Queensland at State of Origin level:
  Jai Arrow 
  Patrick Carrigan
  Xavier Coates
  Reuben Cotter
  Tom Dearden
  Tino Fa'asuamaleaui
  David Fifita
  Dane Gagai
  Tom Gilbert
  Coen Hess
  Valentine Holmes
  Ben Hunt
  Ethan Lowe
  Andrew McCullough
  Josh McGuire
  Anthony Milford
  Michael Morgan
  Justin O'Neill
  Joe Ofahengaue
  Josh Papalii
  Hamiso Tabuai-Fidow
  Murray Taulagi

Results

2008
Played as a curtain raiser to Game II of the 2008 State of Origin series.

2009
Played as a curtain raiser to Game II of the 2009 State of Origin series.

2010
Played as a curtain raiser to Game II of the 2010 State of Origin series.

2011
Played as a curtain raiser to Game II of the 2011 State of Origin series.

2012
Played as a curtain raiser to Game III of the 2012 State of Origin series.

2013
Played as a curtain raiser to Game II of the 2013 State of Origin series.

2014
Played as a curtain raiser to Game II of the 2014 State of Origin series.

2015
Played as a curtain raiser to Game II of the 2015 State of Origin series.

2016
Played as a curtain raiser to Game II of the 2016 State of Origin series.

2017
Played as a curtain raiser to Game II of the 2017 State of Origin series.

2018
Played as a curtain raiser to Game I of the 2018 State of Origin series.

2019
Played as a curtain raiser to Game I of the 2019 State of Origin series.

See also
Queensland state rugby league team
Queensland Residents rugby league team
Queensland under-20 rugby league team
Queensland under-16 rugby league team

References

Res
Rugby League State of Origin
Rugby league representative teams in Queensland